Barrhaven West Ward (Ward 3) is a city ward in Ottawa, Ontario, Canada. The ward consists of the western half of the Barrhaven subdivision. It consists of the neighbourhoods of Cedarhill Estates, Orchard Estates, Strandherd Meadows, Old Barrhaven, Barrhaven Mews, Jockvale, Halfmoon Bay and Stonebridge.

History
 
From 1994 to 2006, the ward was known as Bell-South Nepean Ward. During this period, the ward was much larger, also encompassing the neighbourhoods of Heart's Desire, Davidson Heights, Rideau Glen, Boyce, Clearview, Country Place, Victory Hill, Pineglen, Merivale Gardens, Grenfell Glen, Arbeatha Park, Westcliffe Estates, Lynwood Village, Twin Elm, Fallowfield and Bells Corners. In 2006, these areas were transferred to new wards: The Bells Corners area went to College Ward, the areas along Hunt Club joined Knoxdale-Merivale Ward, Heart's Desire and Davidson Heights joined the new Gloucester-South Nepean Ward and the rural parts joined Rideau-Goulbourn Ward.

From 2006 to 2022, the ward was known as Barrhaven Ward, and ward consisted of the neighbourhoods of Cedarhill Estates, Orchard Estates, The Meadows, Pheasant Run, Fraservale, Barrhaven, Knollsbrook and Longfields.

Following the 2020 Ottawa Ward boundary review, the ward's southern boundary was extended to Barnsdale Road to the south, uniting the Half Moon Bay and Stonebridge neighbourhoods into the ward.  The ward lost the area east of Greenbank Road and north of the Strandherd Road to the new ward of Barrhaven East.

The Ward had been served by Jan Harder on Ottawa City Council since the area was amalgamated into Ottawa in 2000.  She was also the city councillor for Barrhaven Ward on Nepean City Council prior to that, from 1997 to 2000. Doug Collins was the Nepean city councillor from 1994 to 1997.

Demographics
According to the Canada 2011 Census

Ethnic groups: 71.1% White, 6.9% South Asian, 6.4% Chinese, 4.2% Black, 2.7% Arab, 2.2% Aboriginal, 2.1% Southeast Asian, 1.6% Filipino, 1.1% Latin American 
Languages: 71.8% English, 7.4% French, 4.7% Chinese, 2.0% Arabic, 1.2% Spanish, 1.1% Italian, 1.1% Vietnamese  
Religions: 66.3% Christian (39.3% Catholic, 6.7% United Church, 5.8% Anglican, 2.1% Christian Orthodox, 1.9% Presbyterian, 1.4% Pentecostal, 1.1% Lutheran, 1.1% Baptist, 6.9% Other), 4.9% Muslim, 3.2% Hindu, 1.6% Buddhist, 21.8% No religion 
Median income (2010): $45,092 
Average income (2010): $50,269

Regional and city councillors
Prior to 1994, the area was represented by the Mayor of Nepean plus three city and regional councillors.

David Pratt (1994-1997)
Molly McGoldrick-Larsen (1997-2000)
Jan Harder (2001–2022)
David Hill (2022–present)

Election results

1994 Ottawa-Carleton Regional Municipality elections

1997 Ottawa-Carleton Regional Municipality elections

2000 Ottawa municipal election

2003 Ottawa municipal election

2006 Ottawa municipal election
Longtime incumbent Jan Harder faced off against Cathrine Gardiner a freelance photo journalist, Joe King an agricultural economist and T.K. Chu, a systems engineer.

2010 Ottawa municipal election

2014 Ottawa municipal election

2018 Ottawa municipal election

2022 Ottawa municipal election

References

External links
 Map of Barrhaven Ward

Ottawa wards